Serena Williams was the two-time defending champion, but she decided not to participate this year.

Dominika Cibulková won the title, defeating Agnieszka Radwańska in the final, 3–6, 6–4, 6–4.

Seeds
The top four seeds received a bye into the second round.

Draw

Finals

Top half

Bottom half

Qualifying

Seeds
The top six seeds received a bye into the second round.

Qualifiers

Qualifying draw

First qualifier

Second qualifier

Third qualifier

Fourth qualifier

External links
 WTA tournament draws

Bank of the West Classic - Singles
2013 Singles